Xiaowen may refer to:

 King Xiaowen of Qin (reigned 250 BC)
 Emperor Xiaowen of Northern Wei (467–499)
 Emperor Wen of Han (202 BC–157 BC)
 Jiang Xiaowen
 Ye Xiaowen (born 1950), Chinese politician who held various top posts relating to state regulation of religion from 1995 to 2009
 Xiaowen Zeng, Chinese author living in Toronto, Canada
 Zhou Xiaowen (born 1954), Chinese filmmaker
 Xiao Wen Ju (born 1992), Chinese fashion model

See also
 Zhang Xiaowen (disambiguation)